Kevin Daniel Elster (born August 3, 1964) is an American former professional baseball shortstop. Known primarily for his glove, Elster broke a 42-year-old Major League Baseball record by playing 88 consecutive games at shortstop without committing an error.

Early years
Elster was drafted by the New York Mets in the second round of the January  draft out of Golden West College in Huntington Beach, California. He made his major league debut as a late inning defensive replacement on September 2 against the San Francisco Giants, and got his first major league hit in his first major league at bat the following day. Over the remainder of the season, Elster batted .167 with three runs scored. He had one extra base hit, a double off the Philadelphia Phillies' Kevin Gross. He appeared in four games of the 1986 National League Championship Series against the Houston Astros, and game six of the  World Series against the Boston Red Sox. In four postseason at bats, he had no hits.

He batted .310 with eight home runs and 74 RBIs, and set a franchise record with 170 hits. Once again, he received a call up to the majors that September. He collected four hits in ten at bats, and got his first major league RBI with a double off the St. Louis Cardinals' John Tudor on October 2. Following the season, the Mets traded incumbent shortstop Rafael Santana to the New York Yankees in order to open the position up for Elster.

New York Mets
In his first game as the Mets' regular shortstop in the  season opener, Elster hit his first major league home run off the Montreal Expos' Dennis Martinez. His batting average hovered in the low .100s through most of April until a 4-for-5 with two runs and two RBIs performance on April 26 against the Atlanta Braves raised his average above .200. He managed to keep it there the rest of the way. On July 19, Elster committed a first-inning error that led to five unearned runs in the Mets' 11–2 loss to the Cincinnati Reds. It would be his last error of the season.

Elster still holds the National League record, which he broke on April 19.) Somewhat ironically, Elster committed two errors in game four of the 1988 National League Championship Series against the Los Angeles Dodgers.

His first home run of the season on June 4 signaled a reversal of fortune for Elster. From there, he batted .241 with ten home runs and 45 RBIs.

1989 would turn out to be his last full season with the Mets. A shoulder injury ended his 1990 season on August 3. He made it just six games into the  season before shoulder surgery ended his season.

New York Yankees and Philadelphia Phillies
Elster signed a minor league contract with the Dodgers prior to spring training in 1993. He batted .282 in ten games for the double A San Antonio Missions before being released. Shortly afterwards, he signed as a Free agent with the Florida Marlins, and was again immediately released. He signed with the San Diego Padres that Winter, but failed to make the club in Spring training. Shortly into the  season, he signed as a Free agent with the New York Yankees. On June 30, he played in his first major league game in over two years. His tenure with the Yankees would last just seventeen games. In which, he went 2-for-37 before his release on June 8, . After which, he was signed and immediately released by the Kansas City Royals. Shortly afterwards, he joined the Phillies. He went 5-for-17 in his short stay with the triple A Scranton/Wilkes-Barre Red Barons before being brought up to Philadelphia. On August 18, Elster had a four-RBI game against the Giants, and hit his first major league home run in almost five years off Chris Hook. On September 16, facing his former franchise for the first time in his career, Elster went 1-for-3 with a double, walk and two runs scored. Phillies manager Jim Fregosi also used Elster at third and first, the first time he had ever played a position other than short in his major league career.

Texas Rangers and Pittsburgh Pirates
In January , Elster signed with the Texas Rangers. Originally signed to serve as a backup to Benji Gil, Elster became the starter after an injury to Gil. He went on to have a career year, hitting a career high 24 home runs in a career high 596 plate appearances. 92 of his career high 99 RBIs came batting ninth, a major league record. He also had career highs in games (157), runs (79) and extra base hits (58) to earn the Sporting News Comeback Player of the Year award. He returned to the postseason for the first time since 1988, and was 4-for-12 with two runs scored in the 1996 American League Division Series against the Yankees.

During the off-season, he signed a $1.65 million one-year contract with the Pittsburgh Pirates. Batting fifth for the Bucs, Elster got off to a strong start. He went 2-for-4 with a double, two RBIs and a run scored to lead his team to a 5–2 victory over the Giants in the  season opener. On May 16, an injury once again ended Elster's season when he broke his wrist in a collision with Marlins second baseman Kurt Abbott on a sacrifice bunt. After the season, he re-signed with the Rangers. He was batting .232 with eight home runs and 37 RBIs when the Rangers acquired All-Star shortstop Royce Clayton from the Cardinals at the July 31 trade deadline, and released Elster. Elster chose to retire rather than try to sign with another team.

Los Angeles Dodgers
After sitting out the entire  season, Elster was lured out of retirement by former Mets manager Davey Johnson, now managing the Dodgers. He won the starting job at short, and on April 11, in the first game played at Pacific Bell Park in San Francisco, Elster hit three home runs. Despite these early heroics, he eventually lost the starting job to prospect Álex Cora. Elster batted .227 with fourteen home runs and 38 RBIs in 2000. After the season, he retired for good.

Career statistics

He played 13 seasons in from 1986 to 2000 for the Mets, Yankees, Phillies, Rangers, Pirates and Dodgers.

On August 27, 2022, the New York Mets held their first Old Timers Day since 1994. Elster was the starting shortstop for the Amazins where he went 1-1 and recorded a putout.

In pop culture
Elster played the part of Pat Corning in the 1994 movie Little Big League.

In 2021, indie-folk artist Cousin Wolf released a song entitled "Kevin Elster" as part of an album called "Nine Innings."

Personal life
In 108 Stitches, former Mets pitcher Ron Darling's tell-all memoir of his playing days, Darling claims "Elster liked to think of himself as a ladies’ man, and he was. He was always talking about his exploits "

References

External links
, or The Ultimate Mets Database
Kevin Elster at Society for American Baseball Research

1964 births
Living people
Baseball players from Los Angeles
Little Falls Mets players
Lynchburg Mets players
Jackson Mets players
Tidewater Tides players
San Antonio Missions players
Tampa Yankees players
Albany-Colonie Yankees players
Golden West Rustlers baseball players
Scranton/Wilkes-Barre Red Barons players
Omaha Royals players
People from San Pedro, Los Angeles
New York Mets players
New York Yankees players
Philadelphia Phillies players
Texas Rangers players
Pittsburgh Pirates players
Los Angeles Dodgers players
Major League Baseball shortstops